No. 87 Squadron RAF was an aircraft squadron of the Royal Air Force during the First World War and Second World War.

World War I
87 Squadron Royal Flying Corps (RFC) was first formed on 1 September 1917 at Upavon from elements of the Central Flying School. On 17 December 1917, it moved to Hounslow Heath Aerodrome and was equipped with Sopwith Dolphins and S.E.5As, moving on to France in April 1918. After the armistice, the squadron moved back to England and was disbanded at RAF Ternhill on 24 June 1919. The squadron had seven aces, in Arthur Vigers DFC, Leslie Hollinghurst, Henry Biziou, Joseph Callaghan, Charles Darwin, Herbert Joseph Larkin, Alexander Pentland, and Charles Edward Worthington. The squadron's "lazy-S" style insignia in use late in World War I on its Dolphins is said to have been authorised for use by CO Callaghan, whose pre-war time living in Texas, where livestock branding on ranch livestock was common there at that time, could have inspired his choice of squadron insignia.

World War II

87 Squadron was re-formed on 15 March 1937 at RAF Tangmere from elements of No. 54 Squadron RAF, operating the Hawker Fury. At the outbreak of the Second World War, the squadron was part of the air element of the British Expeditionary Force in France, equipped with Hawker Hurricanes. Flight Lieutenant Ian Gleed was posted to the squadron as a replacement pilot on 17 May 1940 and became an ace in two days. He took command of the squadron in December 1940 when it was based at RAF Charmy Down.

John Strachey MP served as the intelligence officer for the squadron during the Battle of Britain.
On 23 July Flt Lt AWG Le Hardy (Tony) took command before being sent on Special Operations as the Air Liaison Officer to the Military Mission to Marshal Tito on the island of VIS off the Dalmatian coast of Croatia. Squadron Spitfires were deployed to the island in support of the commando forces from the airfield organised by A/Sqn Ldr Le Hardy for operations in support of the partisan forces in the Balkans for which he was decorated with the OBE, the youngest officer to receive that award, aged 21. The airfield became a valuable destination for damaged Allied Aircraft saving many lives. {Flying Log Book A Le Hardy OBE RAF}.   

In July 1944 87 Squadron became one of two RAF Squadrons to join No. 8 Wing SAAF (the other being RAF 185 Squadron) and began fighter-bomber operations supporting the fighting in Italy as well as taking part in offensive sweeps across the Balkans from its detached Italian bases. It continued in this role in the Italian Campaign until the end of the war.

The Cold War
87 Squadron was again re-formed as part of the 2nd Tactical Air Force in Germany on 1 January 1952 at RAF Wahn with the Gloster Meteor NF11, with the main tasking being the defence of the Ruhr, after five years it moved to RAF Bruggen, and was equipped with the Gloster Javelin as an all-weather interceptor force until it was disbanded on 3 January 1961.

Aircraft

Notable pilots

World War I
Charles J.W. Darwin
Herbert Larkin
Arthur Vigers

World War II
Geoffrey Allard
Roland Beamont
John Cock
John Dewar
Ian Gleed DSO DFC
Derek Harland Ward

Notes

References

 Royal Air Force Website - 87 Sqn History

  
Halley, James J. 1988. The Squadrons of the Royal Air Force & Commonwealth 1918–1988. Air Britain .

External links

 History page on RAF website

087
087
Military units and formations established in 1917
Military units and formations disestablished in 1961